Travelers Rest, also known as Old Stone House, is a historic home located near Burlington, Mineral County, West Virginia. It was built as a stagecoach stop to service the Northwestern Turnpike. It serviced the corridor between Winchester, Virginia and Parkersburg, Virginia (now West Virginia). The house is believed to have been built in two phases, in 1827 or as early as 1810, and is a stone, Ell-shaped building executed in a vernacular adaptation of the Greek Revival style.

The property is now owned by The Mineral County Historical Foundation. It is being restored and will house artisans and shops for current travelers on U.S. Route 50.

It was listed on the National Register of Historic Places in 2006.

References

Houses in Mineral County, West Virginia
Drinking establishments on the National Register of Historic Places in West Virginia
Greek Revival houses in West Virginia
Houses on the National Register of Historic Places in West Virginia
National Register of Historic Places in Mineral County, West Virginia
Northwestern Turnpike
Stone houses in West Virginia
Vernacular architecture in West Virginia